Dulas or City Dulas is a village in Anglesey, in north-west Wales. It is in the community of Llaneilian.

Origin of the name
The village has never held the status of a city and "City" is not a recognisable Welsh word, so its origin is unclear. It may be that the name came from an Anglicisation of Saith Tŷ, which is Welsh for "Seven Houses".

There are two places in Wales simply called 'City': City, Powys and City, Vale of Glamorgan.

References

Villages in Anglesey
Llaneilian